George Henry Dent (9 March 1899 – 1 September 1983) was an English professional footballer who played as an inside forward.

References

1899 births
1983 deaths
Footballers from Kingston upon Hull
English footballers
Association football inside forwards
Grimsby Town F.C. players
Cleethorpes Town F.C. players
Mexborough Athletic F.C. players
Haycroft Rovers F.C. players
English Football League players